Innerspace, styled as InnerSpace, is a Canadian talk show devoted to news in science fiction, which served as the flagship program of Canadian TV channel Space. The show covered film, television, video games, technology, comic books, gadgets, and other news related to the sci-fi genre. Its hosts were Ajay Fry, Morgan Hoffman, and Teddy Wilson. The show was cancelled on May 24, 2018, due to financial strain.

History
InnerSpace began as HypaSpace in 2002. In 2008, it became The Circuit and brought Ajay Fry on to host. In 2009, with the show re-titled InnerSpace, Teddy Wilson joined as co-host. Two years later, Cynthia Loyst joined the team, before leaving to join The Social. Morgan Hoffman joined the show shortly after that.

Prior to 2007, Space aired a daily news segment called SpaceNews. Videographer Natasha Eloi looked at "what's new" in space and the sciences. SpaceNews Monthly was a best-of show based on these interstitials. Both programs finished their runs at the end of September and October 2005, respectively. Natasha Eloi joined InnerSpace as host and field reporter covering various events happening in the world of sci-fi entertainment. Natasha also hosted and produced a series of segments seen on InnerSpace focused on toy collectibles and high-end prop replicas. "It Came From The Basement With Natasha Eloi" showcased toy collections from fans and celebrities which aired from 2005 to 2010.

Specials

"InnerSpace Presents" were hourlong specials featuring cast and creators of popular sci-fi TV shows & movies.

Notable episodes feature:
 March 2009: cast of Battlestar Galactica
 June 2010: David Blue and Andy Mikita from Stargate Universe
 November 2010: cast and creators of Stargate Universe
 January 2011: cast of Being Human
 July 2012: cast of Doctor Who
 August 2013: cast of The Mortal Instruments: City of Bones
 October 2016: cast of Doctor Who and Class (2016 TV series)

Hosts
 Ajay Fry (2009-2018)
 Teddy Wilson (2009-2018)
 Morgan Hoffman (2013-2018)
 Cynthia Loyst (2011-2013)
 Natasha Eloi (2009-2011)

Podcasts
InnerSpace has 174 iTunes podcasts which offer a weekly report on the Sci Fi, Fantasy, and Horror featured on Space. InnerSPACE features popular podcasts from 2010 on their main page which are listed below

{| class="wikitable"
|-
! Podcast !! Date !! Hosts
|-
| William Gibson, Clone Wars, and the movie Monsters|| 29 October 2010 || Mark Askwith, Natasha Eloi
|-
| TBBT, The Scream Awards, and William Gibson at IFOA || 15 October 2010 || Mark Askwith, Teddy Wilson
|-
| Supernatural; Wes Craven's My Soul To Take || 8 October 2010 || Mark Askwith, Natasha Eloi
|-
| John Hurt on Alien, The latest trends in horror || 22 October 2010 || Mark Askwith, John Hurt
|-
| Hal-Con, Caprica, SGU LIVE || 11 May 2010 || Mark Askwith, Ajay Fry
|-
| SPACE-Mas, Reel Asian Film Fest, and More || 12 November 2010 || Mark Askwith, Natasha Elo
|-
| Your Holiday Comic Book Shopping List|| 19 November 2010 || Mark Askwith, Christopher Butcher
|-
| Year-End entertainment review, interviews with Ryan Robbins and Gavin Stephens || 24 December 2010 || Mark Askwith, Amy Pagnotta
|}

Blogs
InnerSpace cast and crew have blogged on current events in the Sci Fi community with their earliest archive being September 2009. Blogs featured images, videos as well as up-to-date information on events, appearances, new releases, and upcoming projects. Events they have written about include spoilers on the seventh installment of the Harry Potter movie, a guide to the San Diego Comic Con, and information on Space's winning commercials at the Promax Awards. Each blog page may include links to related articles, links to articles by the same author, trailers of the featured content, and a comment box allowing for anonymous 2000-character posts. Blog authors include Rob Moden, "Abelle", "The Crimson King", podcast host Mark Askwith, and finally the hosts of the show itself.

Involvement

In Sci Fi Promotion
InnerSpace was involved in the promotion of all things genre including the most imaginative television series, events, movies, video games, graphic novels, etc.

Awards 
InnerSpace and co-hosts Ajay Fry and Teddy Wilson were honoured in July 2011 by the Constellation Awards, Canada's awards for excellence in science fiction film and television. The two hosts received the award for Outstanding Contribution to Science Fiction Film or Television through popular fan response/submission and earned 39% of the vote over their competitors: actors Amanda Tapping and Robin Dunne, and author Robert J. Sawyer.

References

External links

Entertainment news shows in Canada
CTV Sci-Fi Channel original programming
Television series by Bell Media